Jan Baikowski (1590–1651) was a Roman Catholic prelate who served as Titular Bishop of Aenus (1626–1651) and Auxiliary Bishop of Poznań (1626–1651).

Biography
Jan Baikowski was born in Podlackiae, Poland in 1590.
On 2 December 1626, he was appointed during the papacy of Pope Urban VIII as Titular Bishop of Aenus and Auxiliary Bishop of Poznań.
On 1 May 1627, he was consecrated bishop by Cosimo de Torres, Cardinal-Priest of San Pancrazio, with Joannes Mattaeus Caryophyllis, Titular Archbishop of Iconium, and Germanicus Mantica, Titular Bishop of Famagusta, serving as co-consecrators. 
He served as Auxiliary Bishop of Poznań until his death in 1651.

Episcopal succession

References 

17th-century Roman Catholic bishops in the Polish–Lithuanian Commonwealth
Bishops appointed by Pope Urban VIII
1590 births
1651 deaths